Tom Luken (born 	June 15, 1950) is a former professional American football player who played offensive lineman for six seasons in the National Football League (NFL) with the Philadelphia Eagles.

References

1950 births
Living people
American football offensive linemen
Philadelphia Eagles players
Purdue Boilermakers football players
Players of American football from Cincinnati